Robert Alan Jamieson (born 1958) is a poet and novelist from Shetland, Scotland. He grew up in the crofting community of Sandness. He works as a creative writing tutor at Edinburgh University, having been co-editor of the Edinburgh Review in 1993–1998 and a creative writing fellow at the Universities of Glasgow and Strathclyde in 1998–2001.

Novels
Soor Hearts (1984)
Thin Wealth (1986)
A Day at the Office (1991), named by Edinburgh-based List Magazine among the 100 Best Scottish Books of All Time: "Each page of this book – a precursor to much modern experimental Scottish fiction – looks more like a work of art than a novel."
Da Happie Laand (2010)
MacCloud Falls (2017)

Poetry
Jamieson writes in the Shetland dialect of Scots. Some of his works are:
Shoormal (1986)
Nort Atlantik Drift (1999), reprinted in a bilingual edition in 2007. Includes "Laamint fir da tristie", which was selected as a poem of the week at The Scotsman in June 2008.
Ansin t'Sjaetlin: some responses to the language question (2005)

Anthologies
(Contributor) Pax Edina: The One O' Clock Gun Anthology (Edinburgh, 2010)

See also
Shetland dialect

References

Scottish writers
Scottish poets
Scottish novelists
People from Shetland
Living people
Writers from Edinburgh
1958 births